Yazılı, historically and still informally called Tüm, is a village in the Oğuzeli District, Gaziantep Province, Turkey. The village is inhabited by Abdals of the Kara Hacılar tribe.

References

Villages in Oğuzeli District